Bhamidipati Radhakrishna (14 November 1929 – 4 September 2007) was an Indian playwright and script writer in Telugu cinema. He is the son of Hasya Brahma Bhamidipati Kameswara Rao.

He has written some plays and playlets. His play "Taram - Antaram" was staged at World Telugu Conference, Bangalore.

He has written stories for over 150 Telugu films including Brahmachari, Kathanayakudu, Vichitra Kutumbam, Palleturi Bava, Govula Gopanna, Nari Nari Naduma Murari, College Bullodu.

He died at the age of 79 years in Rajahmundry.

Literary works
 Bhajantreelu (play)
 Danta Vedantam (play)
 Keerti Seshulu (play)
 Manasthathwalu (play)
 Taram - Antaram (play)

Filmography
 Aatma Gowravam (1965)
Govula Gopanna (1968)
 Thalli Prema (1968)
 Kathanayakudu (1969 film) (1969)
Rangeli Raja (1971)
Samsaram (1975)
Eduruleni Manishi (1975)
 Alludochhadu (1976)
Sahasavanthudu (1978)
 Shokilla Rayudu (1979)
Nanna Rosha Nooru Varusha (1980)
College Bullodu (1990)
Iddaru Iddare (1990)

Awards
 He has received the Jandhyala Memorial Award.

References

External links
 

Telugu writers
1929 births
2007 deaths
20th-century Indian dramatists and playwrights
Screenwriters from Andhra Pradesh
Telugu screenwriters
Indian male screenwriters
20th-century Indian male writers
20th-century Indian screenwriters